Panoche Valley Solar Farm is a  130 megawatt (MW), utility-scale solar photovoltaic power station in the Panoche Valley of Central California's San Benito County. Panoche Valley is crossed by a 230-kilovolt (kV) power line from the Moss Landing Power Plant.

Originally proposed by Solargen Energy (later known as Nevo Energy), the project was purchased by PV2 Energy in April 2011, with Nevo Energy retaining a small equity interest, but no voting, governance or management input.  In April 2012, PV2 Energy entered into a joint venture with Duke Energy, the largest utility in the United States.  The project was eventually acquired by Con Edison in 2016.

It is used for pasture-based livestock grazing on native grassland habitat. In October 2010, the San Benito County Board of Supervisors approved the company’s environmental impact report. Originally proposed at 399 MW, the cost was estimated at approximately $1 billion. The project faced lawsuits from three environmental groups who charged that project would harm native species such as the giant kangaroo rat, blunt-nosed leopard lizard, San Joaquin kit fox, and various bird species. The project was downsized to 247 MW and eventually 130 MW in 2017 after a settlement was reached. The plant started producing power in January 2018.

Electricity production

See also

California Valley Solar Ranch

References

External links

 PV2 Energy

Buildings and structures in San Benito County, California
Diablo Range
Solar power stations in California